Perry Kollie (born 3 December 1982) is a Liberian international footballer who plays as a striker for 2nd Division I-League side Royal Wahingdoh F.C.

Career
Kollie began his career in his native Liberia with Invincible Eleven, before moving to Côte d'Ivoire to play with ASEC Mimosas. Kollie has also played in Indonesia for Persikota Tangerang and Perserang Serang.

Kollie made his international debut for Liberia in 2010.

External links

1982 births
Living people
Liberian footballers
Liberia international footballers
Expatriate footballers in Indonesia
Association football forwards